is a railway station in Chiyoda, Tokyo, Japan.

Lines
The ground-level section of the station is managed by the East Japan Railway Company (JR East), and the underground sections are managed by Tokyo Metro and Tokyo Metropolitan Bureau of Transportation (Toei Subway). The station is served by the JR Chūō-Sōbu Line, Tokyo Metro Yūrakuchō Line, Tokyo Metro Namboku Line, and Toei Shinjuku Line. Chūō Line (Rapid) services pass the station.

Ichigaya Station is numbered Y-14 on the Yurakucho Line, N-09 on the Namboku Line, and S-04 on the Shinjuku Line.

Platforms

JR East

Tokyo Metro

Toei Subway

History
The original JNR (now JR East) station opened on 6 March 1895. The Tokyo Metro Yurakucho Line station opened on 30 October 1974, and the Namboku Line station opened on 26 March 1996.

The station facilities of the Yurakucho and Namboku Lines were inherited by Tokyo Metro after the privatization of the Teito Rapid Transit Authority (TRTA) in 2004.

Surrounding area
The headquarters of the Ministry of Defense of Japan and of the Japan Go Association are located in the vicinity of Ichigaya station. The headquarters of Creatures Inc. was also located.

References

External links

 Ichigaya Station information (JR East) 
 Ichigaya Station information (Tokyo Metro) 
 Ichigaya Station information (Toei Subway) 

Chūō Main Line
Chūō-Sōbu Line
Stations of East Japan Railway Company
Railway stations in Tokyo
Tokyo Metro Namboku Line
Railway stations in Japan opened in 1895